Lactarius austrovolemus is a member of the large milk-cap genus Lactarius in the order Russulales. It was first described scientifically by Japanese mycologist Tsuguo Hongo in 1973.

See also
List of Lactarius species

References

External links

austrovolemus
Fungi described in 1973
Fungi of New Guinea